A Little Reunion is a 2019 Chinese television series which focuses on the topic of the National College Entrance Examination, also known as the gaokao. The series airs on Dragon Television, Zhejiang Television, Tencent Video and IQIYI starting July 31, 2019. It is one of the highest rated TV series of 2019, receiving positive reviews from audience.

Plots
A  story about three different families whose children are about to finish their final year of high school and face the “gaokao”, China’s university entrance exam. The three families, Fang, Ji, and Qiao, come to rely on one another as they face many different struggles during the final year of high school.

Stable and loving couple Fang Yuan and Tong Wen Jie but heads with their son, Fang Yifan, over his grades at school. Fang Yuan is usually put in the middle between his wife and son as they get into arguments. Single mom Song Qian is extremely overprotective over her daughter Qiao Yingzi. She doesn’t want Yingzi’s father, Qiao Weidong, from disrupting their life. Ji Yangyang’s parents come back from abroad and he is forced to live with them for many years. He finds it hard to get along with his parents who feel like strangers to him.

The families go through many ups and downs, love, laughter, and tears, as they embark on their final year together.

Cast
Huang Lei as Fang Yuan 
Hai Qing as Tong Wenjie 
Tao Hong as Song Qian 
Sha Yi as Qiao Weidong
Wang Yanhui as Ji Shengli
Yong Mei as Liu Jing
Zhou Qi as Fang Yifan
Li Gengxi as Qiao Yingzi
Guo Zifan as Ji Yangyang 
Liu Jiayi as Lin Lei'er
Ren Zhong as Liu Zheng
Wu Shile as Huang Zhiju
Xu Fanxi as Li Meng
Wang Yuexin as Pan Shuai
Zhong Lili as Wang Yidi
Jin Feng as Xiao Meng
Bai Yu as Chen Qi
Guo Guangping as Principal
Jiao Tiyi as Father Fang
Yang Qing as Mother Fang
Xu Min as Liu Jing's father
Li Yeping as Liu Jing's mother
Wang Qing as Bai Yidi's mother
Yang Yuting as Jenny
Feng Hui as CEO Yang
Jin Xi as Miss Jin (Xiao Jin)
Zhu Tie as Raymond

Award and nominations

References

External links 
 

2019 Chinese television series debuts
2019 Chinese television series endings
Television series by Linmon Pictures
Mandarin-language television shows